The Clark County Shooting Complex, located on the northern outskirts of the Las Vegas–North Las Vegas line in Nevada, is the largest shooting facility in the United States at . At full build out is anticipated that only  will be developed with the rest of the site serving as a buffer for the surrounding community. The park is located at the northern end of Decatur Boulevard at a traffic circle in unincorporated Clark County, just north of the City of Las Vegas boundary.

History
Planning for the park started in 1984. The construction started in January 2008. The park was dedicated on August 25, 2009, and had a soft opening on December 12, 2009, with limited hours and days of operation. The park fully opened in 2010.

Facilities
Rifle range
Skeet shooting
RV park
Archery range
Pistol range
Pistol rentals available.  Onsite safety education course required before using range.
Trap shooting
Shotgun rentals available.
Sport clay shooting (opened Spring 2013)
Golf cart and shotgun rentals available.

References

External links
Clark County Shooting Park 

2009 establishments in Nevada
Buildings and structures in Clark County, Nevada
Parks in Nevada
Shooting ranges in the United States
Tourist attractions in the Las Vegas Valley